Being Human is a supernatural drama television series developed for North American television by Jeremy Carver and Anna Fricke, based upon the British series of the same name created by Toby Whithouse. The series premiered on Syfy and Space Channel on January 17, 2011, with a thirteen episode first season and tells the story of Aidan (Sam Witwer) and Josh (Sam Huntington), a vampire and a werewolf respectively, who move into a new apartment only to discover that it is haunted by the ghost of a previous tenant, Sally (Meaghan Rath). Together, the three of them discover that being human is not as easy as it seems. Season 2 began on January 16, 2012, and adds Kristen Hager to the main cast as Josh's on-and-off girlfriend and fellow werewolf Nora, as well as Dichen Lachman as Suren, the would-be vampire queen of Boston and an old flame of Aidan's.

Cast

Main cast
 Sam Witwer as Aidan Waite
 Meaghan Rath as Sally Malik
 Sam Huntington as Josh Levison
 Kristen Hager as Nora Sargeant
 Dichen Lachman as Suren

Recurring cast
 Kyle Schmid as Henry Durham
 Natalie Brown as Julia
 Dusan Dukic as Reaper/Scott
 Susanna Fournier as Zoe Gonzalez
 Deena Aziz as "Mother"
 Pat Kiely as Nick Fenn
 Robert Naylor as Stevie Adkins
 Kyle Gatehouse as Atlee
 Tracy Spiridakos as Brynn McLean
 Jon Cor as Connor McLean
 Gianpaolo Venuta as Danny Angeli
 Oluniké Adeliyi as Cecilia
 Martin Thibaudeau as Tim Forest
 Amber Goldfarb as Janet Hynes
 Alison Louder as Emily Levison
 Andreas Apergis as Ray
 Rahnuma Panthaky as Rena Malik
 Terry Kinney as Heggemann
 Mark Pellegrino as James Bishop

Episodes

References

External links 
 
 

2012 American television seasons

2012 Canadian television seasons